Topsail–Paradise is a provincial electoral district in Newfoundland and Labrador. As of 2011 there are 14,830 people living in the district.

Topsail–Paradise includes part of the town of Paradise and the part of the town of Conception Bay South. The district was created following the 2015 electoral districts boundaries review. The majority of Topsail–Paradise was previously the district of Topsail. The district also includes former parts of the districts of Conception Bay East-Bell Island and Conception Bay South.

Geography 
The constituency is named after the community of Topsail in Conception Bay South, and the town of Paradise.

Members of the House of Assembly

Election results

|}

References

Newfoundland and Labrador provincial electoral districts
Conception Bay South